Jeffery Stephen Dugan (born April 8, 1981) is a former American football tight end and fullback. He was drafted by the Minnesota Vikings in seventh round of 2004 NFL Draft. He played college football for the University of Maryland. Before college Dugan attended Central Catholic High School, where NFL quarterbacks Dan Marino and Marc Bulger attended.

College career
Dugan attended the University of Maryland, College Park, and he finished his career with 55 receptions for 649 yards (11.8 yards per rec. avg.), and three touchdowns. As a true freshman, he was named the team's freshman of the year and was a Freshman All-American third-team selection by the Sports Page. After the first game of the year, he took over the starting job. He was second on the team in receptions, with 25. In his sophomore year, he started 10 games and was used primarily as a blocker, but had 7 receptions for 64 yards and a touchdown. In his junior year, he started every game and caught 9 passes for 91 yards and a touchdown and was named ACC honorable mention. In his senior year in 2003, he caught 14 passes for 175 yards and was named to the All-ACC second-team.

Professional career

Minnesota Vikings
Dugan was selected by the Minnesota Vikings in the seventh round of the 2004 NFL Draft. In his rookie season, he played in 14 of 16 regular season games, made two starts, and played in two playoff games. Dugan played in the third most games, for Viking rookies that season. Jeff had a career-high three tackles on special teams in a game against Green Bay on November 14, notched a special teams tackle versus Detroit, and made his first career start on Monday Night Football against the Philadelphia Eagles on September 20. Jeff's 2005 season consisted of only one game against the Atlanta Falcons on October 2. He was then listed as inactive for 15 regular season games. Dugan made his first career playoff start versus Green Bay, on January 9, 2005.

In 2006, Dugan made his transition from tight end to full back, when Tony Richardson had a season-ending injury. Dugan handled the transition admirably, and assisted Chester Taylor, as he ran for 1,214 yards, which became the fourth highest in Vikings history. Dugan also helped a pair of running backs rush for 100+ yards in the final seven games of the season. Dugan contributed on special teams as well.

On September 3, 2011, Dugan was waived by the Minnesota Vikings to make room for the 53 man roster.

Personal
He has been spending his off-season pursuing his MBA at Northwestern's Kellogg School of Management.

See also
Minnesota Vikings
List of Maryland Terrapins football people

References

External links
Maryland Terrapins football bio

1981 births
Living people
Sportspeople from Pennsylvania
Players of American football from Pennsylvania
American football fullbacks
American football tight ends
Maryland Terrapins football players
Minnesota Vikings players
Kellogg School of Management alumni
Central Catholic High School (Pittsburgh) alumni